Pacifico is the first studio album by the rock band the Lassie Foundation. It was originally self-released in 1999, but the band re-released the album on October 31st 2000 on the Grand Theft Autumn label. The album has minor-key melodies and falsetto harmonies. The songs contain much guitar, which give the album a fuzzy, shoegaze feel with a lot of feedback. The album is heavily influenced by both My Bloody Valentine and the Beach Boys. The album was highly acclaimed by AllMusic.

Track listing
All songs composed by the band.

"Scapa Flow" - 1:24
"Dive Bomber" - 4:21
"Crown of the Sea" - 4:03
"She's the Coming Sun/She's Long Gone" - 3:17 
"Come On Let Your Lime Light Shine" - 3:18 
"El Rey" - 4:09 
"The Moon Won't Let You Wait" - 3:35
"Kisses as Bounties" - 3:13 
"I've Got the Rock and Roll for You" - 4:09
"Bombers Moon" - 4:38 
"You Are Infinity" - 3:53

References

1999 debut albums